Louis Quier Bowerbank (born 1814) was a physician who, following his experiences of the Sam Sharpe Rebellion and then medical training in Scotland and England, contributed to the efforts to the building of the Lunatic Asylum, later named the Bellevue Hospital, in Jamaica. His statute stands opposite the hospital main entrance.

References

External links 
Worldcat

1814 births
Year of death missing